The 2014–15 season of the Regionalliga (women) was the eighth season of Germany's third-tier women's football league using the current format.

Nord

Nordost

West

Südwest

Süd

Top scorers

References

2014-15
3